The Séance at Hobs Lane is the fifth release by Drew Mulholland (with collaborators), under the pseudonym of Mount Vernon Arts Lab. Originally released through Via Satellite in 2001, the album was re-released on the Ghost Box Music label in 2007, and was created as an unofficial soundtrack to Quatermass and the Pit.

Track listing

Personnel
 Drew Mulholland - composer, synthesizer, theremin, guitar, effects, producer, recording engineer 
 John Cavanagh - composer (track 4), harpsichord & clarinet (track 5), producer, recording engineer
 Norman Blake - composer & guitar (track 3)
 Adrian Utley - composer, mini moog & synthesizer (track 10) 
 Isobel Campbell - cello (track 5)
 Raymond McDonald - saxophone (tracks 8 & 11)
 Morag Brown - flute (track 10)
 Coil - remixer (track 2)
 Barry 7 - remixer (track 7)
 Julian House - artwork (Ghost Box edition)

External links
 Ghost Box Music page

Mount Vernon Arts Lab albums
Ghost Box Music albums
Quatermass
2001 albums
2007 albums